Brand X were an English jazz fusion band from London. Formed in late 1974, the group originally featured vocalist and percussionist Phil Spinelli, guitarists John Goodsall and Peter Bonas, bassist Percy Jones, keyboardist Robin Lumley and drummer John Dillon. After Spinelli, Bonas and Dillon left, the remaining members and new drummer Phil Collins became a largely instrumental outfit. The latest lineup of Brand X included Goodsall alongside keyboardist Chris Clark, percussionist Scott Weinberger, and drummer Kenny Grohowski, and ended in 2021 with Goodsall's death.

History

1974–1980
Brand X were formed in 1974 by Phil Spinelli, John Goodsall, Peter Bonas, Percy Jones, Robin Lumley and John Dillon. Before the end of the year, Dillon had left, and was replaced on a part-time basis by Genesis drummer Phil Collins. After recording an album for Island Records in February 1975 which is shelved, creative differences lead to the departure of both Bonas and Spinelli, leaving Brand X an instrumental four-piece. The group's debut album Unorthodox Behaviour was recorded between September and October 1975 and released the following year.

At the end of 1975, Brand X made their live concert debuts at several shows in and around London. For the performances, they added former Yes and King Crimson drummer Bill Bruford on additional percussion. Shows at the beginning of the following year saw Isotope's Jeff Seopardie in place on Bruford for a couple of shows, followed by Andy Ward of Camel for one, and finally Preston Heyman from late-February. This lineup recorded one album, which was released as Missing Period in 1997. After a final appearance at Reading Festival, Heyman was replaced by Morris Pert.

After recording the band's second album Moroccan Roll, Collins took a break from Brand X for the Genesis Wind & Wuthering Tour. He was initially replaced by Karma drummer Joe Blocker for a string of rehearsals, before Kenwood Dennard took over for shows starting in June. By April 1978, Lumley had followed Collins as the second core member of Brand X to step back from the band, opting instead to focus more on his work as a record producer. He was replaced by J. Peter Robinson in June, at the same time as Chuck Burgi was brought in to take over from Dennard.

In July 1978, during the tour in promotion of the forthcoming Masques, Goodsall was forced to leave temporarily after suffering tendinitis, with Mike Miller taking his place for the rest of the year. For the North American leg of the tour starting in October, the unavailable Burgi was replaced by Mike Clark. In April 1979, Brand X recorded with two lineups – the first with Goodsall, Jones, Robinson and Clark; the second with Goodsall, bassist John Giblin, Lumley and Collins. The material was released as Product in 1979, Do They Hurt? in 1980 and Is There Anything About? in 1982.

Following the recording of the three albums, Brand X toured with a lineup featuring Goodsall, Jones, Lumley, Robinson and Collins. For a month-long tour the following month, Collins was replaced by Clark. Following these dates, the group stopped working together and began to focus on other projects, although they never officially disbanded.

1992–2021
In 1992, Goodsall and Jones reformed Brand X with new drummer Frank Katz, releasing X-Communication and returning to live performances in December. They remained a trio until February 1996, when they recorded Manifest Destiny with new keyboardist Marc Wagnon and other contributors. For the subsequent tour, Katz was replaced by Pierre Moerlen due to problems with his passport, while Kris Sjobring took over from Wagnon. After a final tour in 1999 with Mick Stevens in place of Jones and John Holmes in place of Moerlen, the band broke up for a second time.

17 years later, in the summer of 2016, Goodsall and Jones reformed Brand X for a third time, adding former drummer Kenwood Dennard and new members Chris Clark on keyboards and Scott Weinberger on percussion. The following year, Dennard was replaced by Kenny Grohowski. Founding member John Goodsall died on November 11, 2021. Following Goodsall's death, the two founding members Lumley and Jones confirmed Brand X's disbandment on November 14, 2021 via Facebook.

Members

Final line-up

Former

Timeline

Lineups

References

Brand X